Eduardo Gonçalves de Oliveira (born 30 November 1981), commonly known as Edu, is a Brazilian former professional footballer who played as a striker.

Club career

Beşiktaş
Edu did not start the season well and Carlos Carvalhal benched him for months. He scored a great goal in the last group stage match against Stoke City in UEFA Europa League and Beşiktaş finished first in the group. His first league goal came against Samsunspor in a penalty kick in December 2011. His second goal came in the BJK İnönü Stadium against rivals Bursaspor.

Liaoning Whowin
Edu moved to Chinese Super League club Liaoning Whowin on 28 February 2013. He scored his first goal on his debut for Liaoning.

Hebei China Fortune
On 9 July 2015, Edu transferred to China League One side Hebei China Fortune.

Career statistics

Honours

Club
Suwon Samsung Bluewings
 K League 1: 2008
 League Cup: 2008
 FA Cup: 2009
 Pan-Pacific Championship: 2009

Schalke 04
 DFB-Pokal: 2010–11
 DFL-Supercup: 2011

Jeonbuk Hyundai Motors
 K League 1: 2015, 2017
 AFC Champions League: 2016

References

External links
  
 
 
 
 

Living people
1981 births
Footballers from São Paulo
Association football forwards
Brazilian footballers
Clube Náutico Capibaribe players
VfL Bochum players
1. FSV Mainz 05 players
Suwon Samsung Bluewings players
FC Schalke 04 players
Beşiktaş J.K. footballers
SpVgg Greuther Fürth players
Liaoning F.C. players
Hebei F.C. players
FC Tokyo players
Bundesliga players
2. Bundesliga players
K League 1 players
Süper Lig players
Chinese Super League players
China League One players
J1 League players
Brazilian expatriate footballers
Brazilian expatriate sportspeople in Germany
Expatriate footballers in Germany
Brazilian expatriate sportspeople in South Korea
Expatriate footballers in South Korea
Brazilian expatriate sportspeople in Turkey
Expatriate footballers in Turkey
Brazilian expatriate sportspeople in China
Expatriate footballers in China
Brazilian expatriate sportspeople in Japan
Expatriate footballers in Japan